is a Japanese original anime television series by Studio Gokumi. The series aired in Japan between January and March 2019, and a manga adaptation was serialized from August 9, 2018 to February 15, 2019. The anime series is licensed in North America under a Crunchyroll-Funimation partnership.

Plot
On Naral Island, a hero named Yulia "Yusha" Chardiet and her party of friends confront the Demon Lord plaguing the Kingdom of Lapanesta. However, their sealing spell goes wrong and the girls inadvertently send the Demon Lord back in time to before Yusha became a hero. Reverted to the size of a small girl, the Demon Lord, now known as Mao, becomes a teacher at Yusha's Adventure School with the aim of expelling Yusha so that she'll never become a hero in the future.

Characters
 / 

An energetic girl who aspires to become a hero. While generally dim-witted, she has an incredible amount of luck and an unpredictable nature.
 / 

An elven priest who is quite knowledgeable.
 / 

A powerful warrior who loves to eat, occasionally nibbling on Seira's ears when she gets hungry.
 / 

A mage who has an obsession with the magic cards known as Cartado.
 / 

The Demon Lord who was sent to the past after Yusha's sealing spell went awry. She becomes a teacher at Yusha's school in the hopes of preventing her from ever becoming a hero, but eventually gives up on the idea.
 / 

The princess of the Lapanesta kingdom who dreams of marrying a hero and soon develops feelings for Yusha, enrolling in her school. She, with a special Cartado, also chronicles the activities of the 999th Hero and her party.

A tiny dragon who assists Yusha and the others. But this tiny dragon has a secret voracious appetite--it even swallowed the Undersea Demon Yulia and her party defeated, and even the Demon Lord's Maid Golem.

An unnamed knight who works as a teacher at Yusha's school and gave Mao her job. She is fascinated with young girls, especially Mao.
 

A stone golem created specially as the Demon Lord's assistant. She is found later after Chibi Dragon vomited everything it swallowed prior, with no memories of her past. She became Mao's assistant at school and was named "Meigo."

Media

Manga
A manga adaptation by Izumi Minami began serialization on Hobby Japan's Comic Fire website from August 9, 2018 to February 15, 2019. One volume was published.

Anime
The anime series is directed by Kaori and written by Takashi Aoshima, with animation by Studio Gokumi. The series' character designs are provided by Namori, and Haruko Iizuka is adapting the designs for animation. Egg Firm is producing the anime. The series aired from January 12 to March 30, 2019 on Tokyo MX and BS11. The opening theme is  performed by Hikaru Akao, Shiina Natsukawa, Ari Ozawa, and Inori Minase as their respective characters, and the ending theme is "Wonder Caravan!" performed by Minase. The anime series is licensed in North America under a Crunchyroll-Funimation partnership.

Notes

References

External links
  
  
 

2018 manga
2019 anime television series debuts
Anime with original screenplays
Crunchyroll anime
Fantasy anime and manga
Funimation
Hobby Japan manga
Medialink
Shōnen manga
Slice of life anime and manga
Studio Gokumi
Tokyo MX original programming